Bundle Africa, or simply Bundle is a social payment software that allows users to trade cryptocurrencies, send and receive fiat, and save in dollars and other currencies.

The Bundle Africa application helps users to perform transactions using cryptocurrencies such as Bitcoin, Ether, BUSD, and BNB.

Bundle Africa was founded by Yele Bademosi (Co-founder/CEO at Nestcoin & Founding Partner at Microtraction) and Emmanuel Babalola.

History

Founding and early years 
Bundle was launched in August 2019 by Yele Bademosi and Emmanuel Babalola. It was developed within the Binance ecosystem. Bundle Africa was a remote-first company that began as a startup inside Binance.

Bademosi made his debut as the Director of Binance Labs, the crypto platform's venture arm, where he was responsible for creating Africa's blockchain ecosystem, a position he held until April 2020. He financed some of the most well-known tech businesses in the crypto industry, including Xend, Yellowcard, Bitsika, and Raise, to mention a few, all of which have gone on to achieve great success.

Bundle is a cash and a cryptocurrency social payments app aimed at driving crypto development on the continent by making it more engaging, convenient to use, and inclusive for Africans. The app had over 50 thousand downloads in the first four months following its release, with a 4.4 rating on Google Play and over $4.5 million in transaction volumes. Bundle had a monthly transaction volume of $56 million with over 350,000 customers in its early years.

Bundle Africa grew to 650,000 users in 16 months, mostly through networking, community marketing, as well as a little marketing budget.

Bundle executed a successful pre-seed campaign in September 2019, raising $450k from Binance. In 2020, the African cash and crypto app incorporated innovative and unique security features to ensure that all its crypto assets are safe and secure at all times.

In May 2021, the company launched its native token (BXD).

2021: Bademosi resigns 
Yele Bademosi stepped down as CEO of Bundle Africa on July 31, 2021, with the intention of exploring other areas in the African crypto community that require more support outside of traditional purchase currency trading, while continuing to drive the adoption of digital currency across Africa and the many economic opportunities that come with it. Emmanuel Babalola, the director of Binance Africa, was appointed to take over Yele's role as the incumbent CEO of the company.

Yele parted ways with Bundle Africa on friendly terms. He was pleased that Emmanuel would be taking over the position and went on to say that the director of Binance Labs has made significant contributions to the blockchain ecosystem and that he believes Babalola is the perfect successor he could wish for.

Services 

Bundle Africa teamed together with the Feminist Coalition and The Female Media Network (TEFEM) to offer educational and vocational awards to their respective communities in March 2022. This project was created to recognize International Women's Day. Bundle also sponsored women to pursue free Udemy courses on art, technology, and entertainment.
Bundle Africa has now announced the launch of a webpage in celebration of her second anniversary.

References

External links 
Official Website

Cryptocurrency projects
Payment systems